Tolú is a small municipality and town in Sucre Department, northern Colombia by the Caribbean sea. The municipality has an area of 500 km². It is named for the Tolú, one the pre-Columbian indigenous people of the North Colombia lowlands.

The municipality of Tolú borders North with San Onofre, East with Toluviejo, South with Coveñas, Palmito and Sincelejo.

Notable people 
 Héctor Rojas Herazo (1920–2002), novelist, poet and painter

See also
Toluene

References

External links
 Gobernacion de Sucre - Tolú
 ToluCaribe.com - Recreación, Historia y Cultura de Tolú.

Port cities in the Caribbean
Municipalities of Sucre Department